Bonnie Crombie ( Stack; born February 5, 1960) is a Canadian politician who has served as the 6th and current mayor of Mississauga since December 1, 2014.

From 2008 to 2011, she was a Liberal member of Parliament for the riding of Mississauga—Streetsville and, from 2011 to 2014, she served as councillor for Ward 5 on Mississauga City Council and on the Council of the Region of Peel.

Background 
Crombie was born to Polish/Ukrainian immigrants Veronica (Sega) and Ed Stack in Toronto, Ontario. Her parents separated when she was three, and her mother re-married when she was nine; she took the name of her stepfather Michael Sawarna. The family settled in Etobicoke, where she attended Michael Power/St. Joseph High School. She graduated from St. Michael's College at the University of Toronto in 1982 with a bachelor of arts in political science and international relations, before receiving her Master of Business Administration from the Schulich School of Business at York University in 1992. Before entering politics, Crombie was an entrepreneur and public affairs consultant who worked with many clients including the Insurance Board of Canada,  McDonald's, and Disney.

She married Brian Crombie in 1984, with whom she has three children; the couple divorced in 2020.

Politics 
She served as campaign manager for John Nunziata in his 2003 bid for mayor of Toronto, and as the Greater Toronto Area co-campaign manager for Michael Ignatieff in his 2006 bid for the Liberal Party of Canada leadership.

Crombie was elected as member of Parliament (MP) for the riding of Mississauga—Streetsville as a Liberal candidate in the 2008 Canadian federal election, defeating incumbent MP Wajid Khan who had previously crossed the floor from the Liberals to the Conservative Party. After being elected, Crombie served in Stéphane Dion's Liberal caucus as co-chair of outreach along with Justin Trudeau, as well as the Liberal Party critic for Crown corporations. She was later defeated by Conservative candidate Brad Butt in the 2011 federal election.

On September 19, 2011, Crombie was elected to Mississauga City Council in the by-election to succeed Eve Adams as Councillor for Ward 5, winning by slightly more than 200 votes over Carolyn Parrish. The race also included Adams's ex-husband, Peter. On December 12, 2012, Crombie faced charges over alleged violations of election finance rules when she ran for councillor. At a subsequent hearing in February 2013, the Crown decided to withdraw the charges, saying that financials must be formally audited before any charges could be considered.

With long-serving Mayor of Mississauga Hazel McCallion retiring, the 2014 mayoral election was set to be the city's first genuinely competitive mayoral race in many years. Crombie and former city councillor, Member of Provincial Parliament and federal cabinet minister Steve Mahoney both declared their candidacies among others. Through much of 2014, Mahoney led slightly in most polls, though his lead rarely exceeded the poll's margin of error. However, on October 12, McCallion endorsed Crombie to replace her as mayor, giving  Crombie a 25-point lead over Mahoney. Crombie went on to defeat Mahoney, becoming mayor with 63.49% of the vote.

Crombie announced her run for re-election as mayor for a second term on October 27, 2017. She won the 2018 mayoral election by a wide margin, receiving over 75 percent of the vote. She was re-elected to her third term in the 2022 mayoral election by a wide margin.

Electoral record

Municipal

Federal

References

External links 

City of Mississauga Mayor's Office

1960 births
Living people
Canadian people of Polish descent
Canadian people of Ukrainian descent
Women members of the House of Commons of Canada
Liberal Party of Canada MPs
Mayors of Mississauga
Members of the House of Commons of Canada from Ontario
Politicians from Toronto
University of St. Michael's College alumni
University of Toronto alumni
Women mayors of places in Ontario
Schulich School of Business alumni
21st-century Canadian politicians
21st-century Canadian women politicians